Carmanah Walbran Provincial Park, originally Carmanah Pacific Provincial Park, is a remote wilderness park located inside traditional Ditidaht First Nation (also spelled diiɁdiitidq) ancestral territory. The park covers a land area of  immediately adjacent to Pacific Rim National Park Reserve's West Coast Trail on the south-western, coastal terrain of Vancouver Island.  The provincial park comprises the entire drainage of Carmanah Creek (northwest of the mouth of the creek hosted the kwaabaaduw7aa7tx village, a "local group" whose alliance makes up one branch of the Ditidaht Nation), and a good portion of the lower Walbran River drainage, both of which independently empty into the Pacific Ocean. The park is named after the Anglicized diitiid?aatx word kwaabaaduw7aa7tx, or Carmanah, meaning "thus far upstream" and John Thomas Walbran, a colonial explorer and ship's captain. Access to the park is by gravel logging road from Port Alberni, Lake Cowichan, or Port Renfrew.

The Carmanah Walbran protects extensive tracts of luxuriant Pacific temperate rainforest, and is famous for its ancient old growth, which includes giant western redcedar, coast Douglas-fir, western hemlock, and towering groves of Sitka spruce that grow along the productive riverside flats. However, trails to the Carmanah Giant and many other portions of the park are currently inaccessible due to the neglect and disrepair of the park's boardwalk trail system—trail access via the boardwalk is essential in preserving the area's delicate ecosystem. Although BC Parks received a funding increase in 2012 for the first time in over ten years, BC's provincial government has repeatedly cut funding to the BC Parks' budget, the result of which is BC Parks' inability to staff a sufficient number of Park Rangers to maintain the network of trails and keep the park safe from cedar poachers and illegal logging.

Hiking trails were initially developed in the area by Randy Stoltmann and members of the Western Canada Wilderness Committee (what the Wilderness Committee was referred to at the time) in the late 1980s. The trails were built before the Carmanah Valley was protected in an effort to draw attention to the spectacular old-growth forest and the precariousness of its existence in the face of Vancouver-based logging company, MacMillan Bloedel (now subsumed by Washington-based logging company Weyerhauser).

Current
As of 2014, the extensive trail network woven throughout both the Carmanah and Walbran portions of the park has fallen into disrepair, which makes hiking through neglected areas dangerous for visitors and for the delicate natural balance of the park's ecological systems. The wooden boardwalks have completely collapsed in some segments of the trail and are succumbing to rot in others. Whole portions of the trails are inaccessible due to the ecosystem's dwindling ecological integrity; both the protected reserve and non-protected adjacent areas are affected by industrial resource extraction projects such as clearcutting. When ecological integrity is compromised, symptomatic indicators of ecological instability, such as soil erosion, tree blow-downs and flash floods, occur. While the provincial park website warns of the lack of trail maintenance, and states that trail maintenance is "ongoing", there is no indication of trail improvement.

The rugged road into the main entrance of the remote park is currently being boxed in due to the rapid growth of alder trees that effectively narrow the single dirt lane from either side. The roads into the park are active dirt and gravel logging roads. The constant traffic of fast-moving, heavy machinery disrupts the uneven road-bed, which then becomes laden with sharp rocks, potholes and washboard ripples; spare tires are a must when travelling to the park. Access to the Upper Walbran is perhaps even more dangerous due to active logging in the unprotected portions of the Walbran, near places like the Walbran's Castle Grove, however, the park may still be reached on back roads from Port Alberni, Lake Cowichan, or Port Renfrew.

History
According to Western Canada Wilderness Committee records, the spectacular old growth Sitka grove was spotted by Randy Stoltmann and a friend in the early 1980s. In 1985, Stoltmann wrote an article titled "Canadian Landmarks: Protection for our largest, tallest and oldest trees", that coincided with the centennial celebration of the establishment of Banff National Park, the first Canadian national park, located in Banff, Alberta. The Western Canada Wilderness Committee Educational Report is the first public record of a call to protect the old growth forests within the Carmanah Valley from encroaching logging companies, such as the aforementioned Macmillan Bloedel. Protests and civil disobedience led by First Nations kwaabaaduw7aa7tx hereditary chief, Peter Knighton, and conservationists like Randy Stoltmann and members of the WCWC began in 1988 in response to, among many things, logging company fellers working "accidentally" inside the riparian zone in order to illegally harvest the valuable giants: the civil disobedience extended well into the early 1990s. The protests worked to garner public support and fought to gain provincial funding that would enable the area to become a park and thus be protected against the long lasting and detrimental effects of deforestation. Protesters chained themselves to some of the great Sitka spruce while camped out in portaledges at heights of over 50 metres. In response to the success of the land defender's and activist's civil disobedience and the public support of the ongoing protests of the early 1990s, the province conceded, bought the tree farm licences off of MacMillan Bloedel (note: the provincial government paid MacMillan Bloedel $83.75 million for their lost tree farm licences in the Carmanah Walbran, including the interest "that has accumulated since the parks were created in 1991 and 1995. That amount was fixed as of January 1, 1999 and interest will accumulate on the principal until such time as it is paid in full.") and created Carmanah Pacific Provincial Park in 1990. The remainder of the Carmanah Valley and the lower part of the area drained by Walbran River were added in 1995 to form the current park.

Ecology

This area lies within the coastal western hemlock (CWH) biogeoclimatic zone. Biogeoclimatic zones can be further divided into subzones, of which this park contains three. Immediately adjacent to the ocean lies the CWH Southern Very Wet Hypermaritime subzone, which is intimately shaped by the forces of the sea. This subzone is often referred to as the "spruce fringe forest" and is characterized by the dominance of sitka spruce, which is specially adapted to withstand the magnesium salts of sea spray. Other characteristic species include leatherleaf polypody fern and evergreen huckleberry.

Just inland is the CWH Submontane Very Wet Maritime subzone, which comprises the majority of the area of Carmanah Walbran park. The dominant coniferous trees here are western hemlock, coast Douglas-fir, western redcedar, and Sitka spruce. The year-round mild and humid climate produces ideal conditions for the development of extensive epiphyte communities in the forest canopy.

The forest contains twice the biomass of tropical rainforests. Marbled murrelet nests have been found in the area.

See also
List of British Columbia Provincial Parks
List of protected areas of British Columbia

References

External links 

 Carmanah Walbran Provincial Park (Official BC Ministry of Environment page)
 How Carmanah Valley was protected (Western Canada Wilderness Committee Historic Campaign)
 Economic Benefits of British Columbia's Provincial Parks  
 Conservation of Ecological Integrity in B.C. Parks and Protected Areas 

Provincial parks of British Columbia
West Coast of Vancouver Island
1990 establishments in British Columbia